Pleurodeles poireti, the Edough ribbed newt or Poiret's newt, is a species of salamander in the family Salamandridae. It is found only in the Edough Massif, in the north east of Algeria.

The natural habitats are of these newts are rivers, intermittent rivers, swamps, freshwater marshes, intermittent freshwater marshes, cisterns and ponds. They are threatened by habitat loss.

The true P. poireti newts are restricted to the Edough Massif area, in Numidia. Formerly, this species was confused with the Algerian ribbed newt Pleurodeles nebulosus, which has a much wider distribution.

References

External links
 Algerian Newt at www.amphibiaweb.org
 Link to photo

Newts
Amphibians of North Africa
Endemic fauna of Algeria
Taxonomy articles created by Polbot
Amphibians described in 1836